The Young Knives ...Are Dead ...And Some is a compilation of tracks by the Young Knives, released on 30 July 2007. The band's former label Shifty Disco released the compilation of the tracks from The Young Knives... Are Dead and its follow-up EP Rollerskater. The album is an enhanced CD, which enables owners to access the rare music video for "Walking on the Autobahn".

Track listing
 "Walking on the Autobahn" – 2:52
 "English Rose" – 3:06
 "John" – 2:55
 "The Night of the Trees" – 2:30
 "Grand Opening" – 3:41
 "Working Hands" – 3:04 
 "Diamonds in the West" – 4:30
 "Rollerskater" – 2:51
 "So Sue Me" – 2:51
 "St Petersburg Wedding" – 1:23

Personnel 
 Henry Dartnell – vocals, guitar
 Thomas "The House of Lords" Dartnell – Bass guitar, vocals
 Oliver Askew – drums

Young Knives albums
2007 compilation albums